Cup Winners' Cup may refer to:

UEFA Cup Winners' Cup
African Cup Winners' Cup
Asian Cup Winners' Cup
Arab Cup Winners' Cup
CONCACAF Cup Winners Cup
Oceania Cup Winners' Cup
FIBA European Cup Winners' Cup